Joseph Knebel Savage (May 21, 1879 in New York, New York – March 10, 1956 in Asbury Park, New Jersey) was an American figure skater who competed in pairs and ice dance.  Teamed with Edith Secord, he won the bronze medal in pairs at the United States Figure Skating Championships in 1929 and 1930 and finished eighth at the 1930 World Figure Skating Championships.  He then teamed with Gertrude Meredith, capturing two more bronze medals at the U.S. Championships in 1932 and 1933 and finishing seventh out of seven pairs at the 1932 Winter Olympic Games (when Savage was 52 years old).

Savage later switched disciplines to ice dance and teamed with Marjorie Parker to win the first official United States championship in 1936.  After he and Parker won a silver medal at the 1937 nationals, he joined forces with partner Katherine Durbrow to win another silver in 1938.  The following year, he and Nettie Prantell finished second at the U.S. Championships.  He later re-teamed with Parker, and the duo won a silver medal at the 1943 Nationals, at which time Savage was 63.

Savage was also an administrator in several figure skating organizations.  Away from the ice, he was an attorney.

Results

Pairs
(with Secord)

(with Meredith)

Ice Dance
(with Parker)

(with Durbrow)

(with Prantell)

Fours
(with Nettie Prantel, Marjorie Parker, and George Boltres)

References

1879 births
1956 deaths
Sportspeople from New York City
American male ice dancers
American male pair skaters
Olympic figure skaters of the United States
Figure skaters at the 1932 Winter Olympics